Bongouanou Department is a department of Moronou Region in Lacs District, Ivory Coast. In 2021, its population was 193,158 and its seat is the settlement of Bongouanou. The sub-prefectures of the department are Andé, Assié-Koumassi, Bongouanou, and N'Guessankro.

History

Bongouanou Department was created in 1980 as a split-off from Dimbokro Department. Using current boundaries as a reference, from 1980 to 2009 the department occupied the same territory as Moronou Region.

In 1997, regions were introduced as new first-level subdivisions of Ivory Coast; as a result, all departments were converted into second-level subdivisions. Bongouanou Department was included in N'Zi-Comoé Region.

In 2009, Bongouanou Department was split into three in order to create Arrah Department and M'Batto Department

In 2011, districts were introduced as new first-level subdivisions of Ivory Coast. At the same time, regions were reorganised and became second-level subdivisions and all departments were converted into third-level subdivisions. At this time, Bongouanou Department became part of N'Zi Region in Lacs District. In 2012, it was joined with Arrah and M'Batto Departments to form the new Moronou Region.

Notes

Departments of Moronou Region
1980 establishments in Ivory Coast
States and territories established in 1980